Jules de Wailly, full name Augustin Jules de Wailly (12 September 1806 – 12 July 1866) was a 19th-century French playwright. He was Gustave and Léon de Wailly's brother. 

The son of Étienne-Augustin de Wailly, and grandson of Noël François de Wailly, an official at the Interior Ministry (1840), his plays were presented on the most significant Parisian stages of the 19th century including the Théâtre des Variétés, the Comédie-Française, the Théâtre du Gymnase dramatique, and the Théâtre du Vaudeville.

Works 
1839: Le Comité de bienfaisance, comedy in 1 act, with Charles Duveyrier
1841: La Maschera, opéra comique in 2 acts
1843: Un Péché de jeunesse, comedy in 1 act, mingled with song, with Joseph Isidore Samson
1844: Le Mari à la campagne, comedy in 3 acts, with Jean-François-Alfred Bayard
1844: Un Amant malheureux, comédie-vaudeville in 2 acts
1845: Deux compagnons du tour de France, comédie-vaudeville in 2 acts, with Lockroy
1849: Elzéar Chalamel, ou Une assurance sur la vie, comédie-vaudeville in 3 acts, with Gustave de Wailly
1849: Moiroud et compagnie, comédie-vaudeville in 1 act, with Bayard
1850: Les Deux célibats, comedy in 3 acts, with Overnay
1850: Discours prononcé sur la tombe de M. Narjot, maire de Pantin
1850: La Famille du mari, comedy in 3 acts, mingled with songs, with Overnay
1851: Contre fortune bon cœur, comédie-vaudeville in 1 act, with Armand Joseph Overnay
1852: Les Premières armes de Blaveau, comédie-vaudeville in 1 act, with Gustave de Wailly
1854: Un Conte de fées, comédie-vaudeville in 2 acts, with Germain Delavigne
1854: Une Rencontre dans le Danube, opéra comique in 2 acts, with Delavigne, music by Paul Henrion
1873: Œuvres de MM. Alfred, Gustave et Jules de Wailly, Firmin-Didot, (posthumous)

Bibliography 
 Joseph Marie Quérard, La littérature française contemporaine: XIXe siècle, 1857, (p. 592)
 Haydn's Universal Index of Biography from the Creation to the Present Time, 1870, (p. 562)

19th-century French dramatists and playwrights
1806 births
Writers from Paris
1866 deaths